
Year 577 (DLXXVII) was a common year starting on Friday (link will display the full calendar) of the Julian calendar. The denomination 577 for this year has been used since early medieval times, when the Anno Domini calendar era became the prevalent method in Europe for naming years.

Events 
 By place 

 Byzantine Empire 
 Byzantine–Sassanid War: A Byzantine expeditionary force under command of Justinian (magister militum) invades Caucasian Albania, launching raids across the Caspian Sea against the Persians.
 Summer – Tiberius, Byzantine co-ruler (Caesar), establishes a naval base at Derbent on the Caspian Sea to construct a Byzantine fleet (approximate date).
 Winter – Maurice is appointed commander-in-chief of the Byzantine army in the East. He succeeds Justinian, despite complete lack of military experience.

 Europe 
 Battle of Deorham: The Anglo-Saxons under Ceawlin of Wessex invade the lower Severn Valley, and defeat the British Celts at Dyrham (South West England). After the battle, the Saxons occupy the three cities: Cirencester, Gloucester and Bath, bringing their advance to the Bristol Channel (according to the Anglo-Saxon Chronicle).
Reccopolis (modern Zorita de los Canes) in Hispania is founded by King Liuvigild, in honour of his son Reccared.

 Asia 
 Winter – Northern Qi, one of the Northern Dynasties, is conquered by Northern Zhou under Emperor Wu Di. He orders the last ruler (Gao Wei) and other members of the Gao clan to commit suicide. Northern China, above the Yangtze River, is once again brought under the control of a single power.

 By topic 

 Religion 
 The Temple of Dendur, dedicated to the Egyptian gods Isis, Harpocrates (Horus) and Osiris, is converted for use as a Christian church (approximate date).
 Eutychius is restored as patriarch of Constantinople, after an exile of 12 years at Amasia (modern Turkey).
 Muhammad, age 6, returns to his immediate family, but within a year his mother Aminah bint Wahb dies.

 Science and Invention 
 A predecessor of the modern match, small sticks of pinewood impregnated with sulfur, are first used in China. Besieged by military forces of Northern Zhou and Chen, Northern Qi court ladies use the "lighting sticks" to start fires for cooking and heating.

Births 
 Pope Agatho (approximate date)
 Princess Ningyuan, Chinese princess
 Uthman ibn Affan, Muslim Caliph (d. 656)

Deaths 
 August 31 – John Scholasticus, patriarch of Constantinople
 Aldate, bishop and saint
 Aminah bint Wahb, mother of Muhammad
 Brendan, Irish abbot (approximate date)
 Gao Heng, emperor of Northern Qi (b. 570)
 Gao Wei, emperor of Northern Qi (b. 557)
 Gao Yanzong, prince of Northern Qi
 Lu Lingxuan, noblewoman of Northern Qi
 Mu Tipo, high official of Northern Qi
 Xiao Zhuang, prince of the Southern Dynasties (b. 548)

References